This is a list of English football transfers for the 2010 summer transfer window. Only moves featuring at least one Premier League or Championship club are listed.

The summer transfer window began once clubs had concluded their final domestic fixture of the 2009–10 season (only for teams in the same association e.g. FA or SFA), but many transfers will only officially go through on 1 July because the majority of the contracts finish on 30 June. The window remained open until 18:00 BST on 31 August 2010. Transfers between English and foreign clubs may only be made from 9 June 2010 onward.

Players without a club may join one at any time, either during or in between transfer windows. Clubs outside the Premier League may also sign players on loan at any time. If need be, clubs may sign a goalkeeper on an emergency loan, if all others are unavailable.

Transfers

1 Player will move when his contract expires on 1 July.
2 Move officially went through on 10 May.
3 Lauri Dalla Valle and Alex Kacaniklic were part of a player swap for Paul Konchesky.

References

English
Transfers Summer 2010
Summer 2010